The men's long jump at the 1966 European Athletics Championships was held in Budapest, Hungary, at Népstadion on 30 and 31 August 1966.

Medalists

Results

Final
31 August

Qualification
30 August

Participation
According to an unofficial count, 20 athletes from 12 countries participated in the event.

 (1)
 (1)
 (1)
 (3)
 (3)
 (1)
 (2)
 (1)
 (2)
 (3)
 (1)
 (1)

References

Long jump
Long jump at the European Athletics Championships